Ismael González Moreno (born 16 June 1978) is a Mexican former professional boxer who competed from 1997 to 2013. He held the WBC FECARBOX featherweight title from 2003 to 2004.

Professional career

WBC FECARBOX Championship
In October 2003, González upset the veteran Armando Hernández to win the WBC FECARBOX featherweight title.

On 10 December 2004 González lost to Humberto Soto at El Foro in Tijuana, Mexico.

References

External links

Boxers from Mexico City
Super-featherweight boxers
1978 births
Living people
Mexican male boxers